Godar-e Namak (also Romanized as Godār-e Namaḵ) is a village in Kulkani Rural District, Majin District, Darreh Shahr County, Ilam Province, Iran. At the 2006 census, its population was 571, in 94 families. The village is populated by Lurs.

References 

Populated places in Darreh Shahr County
Luri settlements in Ilam Province